The 2009 Tunis Open was a professional tennis tournament played on outdoor red clay courts. It was part of the Tretorn SERIE+ of the 2009 ATP Challenger Tour. It took place in Tunis, Tunisia between April 27 and March 3, 2009.

Singles entrants

Seeds

 Rankings are as of April 20, 2009.

Other entrants
The following players received wildcards into the singles main draw:
  Gastón Gaudio
  Walid Jallali
  Malek Jaziri
  Adrian Ungur

The following players received entry from the qualifying draw:
  Albert Ramos-Viñolas
  Laurent Recouderc
  David Savić
  Pedro Sousa

Champions

Men's singles

 Gastón Gaudio def.  Frederico Gil, 6–2, 1–6, 6–3

Men's doubles

 Brian Dabul /  Leonardo Mayer def.  Johan Brunström /  Jean-Julien Rojer, 6–4, 7–6(6)

References
2009 Draws
Official website
ITF search 

Tunis Open
Tennis tournaments in Tunisia
Tunis Open